Sture Helge Vilhelm Pettersson (30 September 1942 – 26 June 1983) was a Swedish cyclist. He was part of the road racing team of four Pettersson brothers, known as Fåglum brothers, who won the world title in 1967–1969 and a silver medal at the 1968 Olympics; three of the brothers were also part of the bronze-winning road team at the 1964 Games. In 1967 they were awarded the Svenska Dagbladet Gold Medal.

Petterson turned professional after the 1969 World Championships, together with the other brothers, but had little success and retired in 1972. He was known for pushing himself to the limits. At a 1964 race in Malmö he fainted 12 km before the finish; his brother Gösta rode nearby and managed to catch him from falling. Sture died aged 40, probably due to a ruptured blood vessel in the brain. His grandson Marcus Fåglum also became a leading road racing cyclist.

Major results

1964
 3rd  Team time trial, Summer Olympics
1965
 National Road Championships
1st  Time trial
2nd Road race
1966
 1st  Team time trial, National Road Championships
1967
 1st  Team time trial, UCI Road World Championships (with Gösta, Tomas & Erik Pettersson)
 1st  Team time trial, National Road Championships
1968
 1st  Team time trial, UCI Road World Championships (with Gösta, Tomas & Erik Pettersson)
 1st  Team time trial, National Road Championships
 2nd  Team time trial, Summer Olympics (with Gösta, Tomas & Erik Pettersson)
1969
 1st  Team time trial, UCI Road World Championships (with Gösta, Tomas & Erik Pettersson)
 1st  Team time trial, National Road Championships

References

External links

 

1942 births
1983 deaths
Swedish male cyclists
Olympic cyclists of Sweden
Olympic silver medalists for Sweden
Olympic bronze medalists for Sweden
Olympic medalists in cycling
Cyclists at the 1964 Summer Olympics
Cyclists at the 1968 Summer Olympics
Sportspeople from Västra Götaland County
Medalists at the 1964 Summer Olympics
Medalists at the 1968 Summer Olympics
UCI Road World Champions (elite men)
Fåglum brothers